Tamally Maak, also often Tamally Ma'ak (in Arabic تملي معاك) is an international Egyptian Arabic language song by the Egyptian pop star Amr Diab in 2000 from his album of the same name.

"Tamally Maak", meaning "Always with you", is written by Ahmed Ali Moussa and the music for the song was composed by Sherif Tag. Original arrangement was by Tarek Madkour. The very popular video was filmed in Czech Republic and the instrumentation prominently included the classic guitar.

Language covers
The song has been interpreted in a large number of languages, including:
Albanian: "Vetem ty te kam" by Gazmend Rama (Video)
Armenian: "Vonc Heranam" (Ոնց հեռանամ) by Olga Ayvazyan (Video)
Bulgarian: "Skitam Se Az" (Скитам се аз) by Ivana (Video)
English: "Callin U" by Outlandish (Video)
English: "Pretty My Pretty" by Avraam Russo (bilingual with Arabic) (Video)
Greek: "Gia Proti Fora" by Lefteris Pantazis (Video)
Greek: "Ego Den Mporo" by Makis Dimakis (Video)
Hebrew: "Ata be libi" by Duo Datz (Video)
Hebrew: "Tamally Maak" by Tsaḥi Halevi (Video)
This rendition is in the original Arabic; the title has merely been transliterated into Hebrew.
Hebrew: "Tamally Maak" by Sofi Tsedaka (Video)
This rendition is in the original Arabic; the title has merely been transliterated into Hebrew.
Hindi: "Kaho Na Kaho" by Amir Jamal (bilingual with Arabic) (Video)
Kannada: "Oho Nasheyo" (ಓಹೋ ನಶೆಯೋ) by Gurukiran (Video)
Persian: "Didi Goftam" by Farshid Amin (Video)
Romanian: "Sunt singur pe drum" by Iulian Copilu (Video)
Russian: "Daleko Daleko" (Далеко-далёко) by Avraam Russo (Video)
Serbian: "Doživeću ja" (Доживећу jа) by Mile Kitić (Video)
Spanish: "Te Quiero a Ti" by Antonio Carmona (Video)
Spanish: "Te Voy a Dejar" by Andrea Del Valle Bela (Video)
Tamil: "Boomiku Velichamellam" (பூமிக்கு வெளிச்சமெல்லாம்) by Gayathri and Vijay Antony (Video)
Turkish: "Gönül Yarası" by Erkan Guleryuz ((Video)

Film appearances
The Hindi version (Kaho Na Kaho) was used for the Soundtrack of the 2004 Hindi film Murder.
The Tamil version (Bhoomiku, only introductory tune) was used for the soundtrack of the 2006 Tamil movie Dishyum.
The Kannada version was used for the soundtrack of the 2006 Kannada movie Ganda Hendathi.
The song was used in the French 2009 film Coco.
The song was used in the Israeli TV series Fauda, sung by Tzachi Halevy.
The song was used in the American film Just Like A Woman (2012) By [Rachid Boucharb] in 01:10:49

Covers
In 2000, the song was covered in English by Armenian-Russian singer Avraam Russo. Despite being predominantly in English, Russo did retain the song's Arabic lyrics in a few verses. He also did a full Russian cover with different lyrics (The Lost Paradise).

In 2016, the song was revived by Canadian-Lebanese artist Miray who remixed it into an English/Arabic amalgam, featuring rapper Jay Soul.

References

External links
 Official Video

Amr Diab songs
Egyptian songs
2000 songs